Transformers: Dark of the Moon is a 2011 science-fiction film.

Transformers: Dark of the Moon may also refer to:

 Transformers: Dark of the Moon (video game)
 Transformers: Dark of the Moon – The Album
 Transformers: Dark of the Moon – The Score

See also
 Dark of the Moon (disambiguation)
 Transformers (disambiguation)